Robert Cortes (born July 28, 1948) is a retired American professional wrestler and trainer, known by his ring name Bobby Bold Eagle, who wrestled throughout the United States for the National Wrestling Alliance and the World Wide Wrestling Federation during the late 1960s and 1970s.

Career
A protégé of Argentina Rocca, he made his WWWF debut in September 1968.

Cortes wrestled throughout the world during his near 15-year career including countries such as Guatemala, Mexico, Puerto Rico, Japan, Saudi Arabia, Africa and most of Europe. While in Joint Promotions in the 1980s, he held the promotion's tag team championship as part of a kayfabe "brother" tag team with former student Al Bold Eagle. He was also a sometimes ally of Big Daddy in his feud with Wild Angus Campbell and wrestled the likes of Pete LaPaque, Rollerball Rocco, Lucky Gordon, "Superstar" Mal Sanders, Dr. Death and Skull Murphy.

Retirement
After his retirement in 1991, following a tour of Spain and Germany, Cortes was the head trainer in the Lower East Side Wrestling School, owned and operated by Pete McKay in New York City, New York. Among his former students include Billy Firehawk, Tiger Khan (Marlon Kalkai), Peligro (Abe Guzman), Panther  Chris Kanyon, Primo Carnera II and The Power Twins (Larry and David Sontag) as well as ECW alumni The Dirt Bike Kid, Rocco Rock, and Jason Knight.

Championships and accomplishments
Joint Promotions
Joint Promotions Tag Team Championship (1 time) - with Al Bold Eagle
Three Rivers Wrestling Association
West Virginia Heavyweight Championship (1 time)
Other titles
AAW Junior Heavyweight Championship (1 time)
CCW Junior Heavyweight Championship (1 time)
Canadian Junior Heavyweight Championship (1 time)

References

External links
Bobby Bold Eagle on Myspace
Bobby Bold Eagle at OnlineWorldofWrestling.com

1948 births
American male professional wrestlers
Living people
People from Window Rock, Arizona
Sportspeople from New York City
Professional wrestlers from Arizona
Professional wrestling trainers